Frasers Group plc (formerly known as Sports Direct International plc) is a British retail, sport and intellectual property group, named after its ownership of the department store chain House of Fraser. The company is best known for trading predominantly under the Sports Direct brand which operates both physical outlets and online. Other retailers owned by the company include Jack Wills, GAME, Flannels, USC, Lillywhites and Evans Cycles. The company owns numerous intellectual property, including the brands Everlast, Lonsdale, Slazenger and No Fear. The group also expanded into operating fitness clubs, launching the Everlast Fitness Club chain in 2020.

Established in 1982 by Mike Ashley, the company is the United Kingdom's largest sports-goods retailer and operates roughly 670 stores worldwide.  The company's business model is one that operates under low margins. Mike Ashley has continued to hold a majority stake in the business, and his holding has been 61.7 percent since October 2013. It is listed on the London Stock Exchange and it is a constituent of the FTSE 100 Index.

History

Early history
The company was founded by Mike Ashley in 1982 as a single store in Maidenhead trading under the name of "Mike Ashley Sports".

Going public
In late November 2006, a number of business newspapers reported that Ashley was looking at an IPO of Sports World International. He hired Merrill Lynch, who valued the group at up to £2.5bn ahead of a possible flotation on the London Stock Exchange. The group debuted on the exchange on 27 February 2007.

Corporate finance and mergers
By December 2006, Sports Direct had built up a 29.4% stake in Blacks Leisure Group, the owner of Millets. In 2007 Ashley held talks with John Hargreaves, founder of Matalan on both taking a 25% stake in the troubled retail business and installing mezzanine floors in larger Matalan stores, on which SportsDirect.com outlets could be operated. In June 2007, the company acquired Everlast for £84 million.

By July 2008, Sports Direct was also holding a 12.3% holding in the John David Group, parent of JD Sports. The stake amounted to 11.9% of JD Sports in November 2013. Sports Direct formerly held 5% of Amer Sports. In 2012 Sports Direct purchased rival retailer JJB's brand name, website, 20 stores and all of their stock in a deal for approximately £24m. The deal saved around 550 jobs.

In February 2013, after fashion retailer Republic went into administration, Sports Direct bought 116 Republic stores, the brand name and the company's head office from the administrator for an undisclosed sum. In July 2013, more than 2,000 full-time staff were awarded around £70,000 each under the company's bonus share scheme. On 13 January 2014, Sports Direct bought 4.6% of Debenhams shares. The stock market purchase of 56.8 million shares (worth around £46m) was made without the prior knowledge of the Debenhams board. Sports Direct stated at the time it intended to be a supportive share holder. The Debenhams board responded by stating they were open-minded with regard to exploring operational opportunities to improve its performance. Sports Direct sold its shares on 16 January 2014, although they took out an option to buy further shares up to a total of 6.6%.

In December 2016, Sports Direct agreed to sell the remaining international rights to its Dunlop brand to Sumitomo Rubber Industries for £112 million ($137.5 million). Sumitomo already own the rights to the brand in Japan, South Korea and Taiwan. The sale was due to be completed by May 2017. In July 2017, the company acquired a 26% stake in Game Digital.

Employee conditions and legal breaches
Between 2013 and 2014, ambulances were dispatched to Sports Direct HQ's facilities more than 80 times, including one concerning a woman who gave birth in the facility's bathroom.

In October 2015, the chief executive of Sports Direct, David Forsey, was charged with a criminal offence for consultation failures over USC staff who only had 15 minutes notice of redundancy. In December 2015, an investigation by The Guardian found that the company fines staff for late clocking on, does not award overtime for late clocking off, relies on zero hour contracts, and regularly makes staff wait unpaid for a security check at the end of shifts. A union official suggested that these practices were illegal as they brought workers' earnings below the minimum wage. The company responded by saying there were unspecified inaccuracies in the reports. A representative from the charity ShareAction claimed that workers are "jeopardising their health" for fear of being dismissed while another shareholder said the company's reputation as an employer was "atrocious".

Late in December 2015 Sports Direct announced a 15 pence per hour increase for staff currently receiving less than minimum wage, taking them above minimum wage, the annual cost of this was said in the announcement to be ~£10 Million (GBP); however it was immediately noted that £0.15p × 37.5 hours × 19,000 staff × 52 weeks = 5,557,500 (~£5.5 million), this and other factors resulted in many (including Unite) calling it a "PR Stunt". Workers on zero-hours contracts are not included in the rise and neither are those already paid more than minimum wage (management/supervisors etc.) therefore the 19,000 staff above is actually substantially fewer.

In August 2016, Sports Direct admitted breaking the law and agreed to disburse unlawfully withheld wages totalling about £1m to the affected workers. As of March 2017, some Sports Direct workers were yet to receive backpay for their time worked, because of a disagreement regarding how contracts changing between employment agencies should be handled. In November 2016, six MPs from the Business and Skills Committee visited Sports Direct, and reported that while there, Sports Direct attempted to place them under surveillance. In February 2017, it was reported that Sports Direct had failed to inform its workforce of a data breach of their personal information after an attacker gained access to its internal systems in September 2016. The Information Commissioner's Office stated it was aware of "an incident from 2016 involving Sports Direct" and would "be making enquiries."

The company announced on 16 December 2019 that it would change its name from Sports Direct International plc to Frasers Group plc effective from 17 December 2019.

It was announced in September 2021 that Michael Murray was to be the incoming CEO of Frasers Group, taking over Ashley's role, in May 2022.

In July 2022, chief operating officer David Al-Mudallal announced in a memo that the company will stop allowing its office staff to work from home on Fridays, as had been practice for the last few years. The reason behind this decision was the fact that many workers did not take working from home seriously enough and were often non-contactable.

Operations
The group has over 470 UK stores including the chains Sports Direct (Sports World prior to 2008), Lillywhites, House of Fraser, Flannels, Evans Cycles, Sofa.com, Field & Trek and USC. Sports Direct-branded stores exist under a franchising agreement in South Africa and the Middle East. In 2006 it overtook JJB Sports as the UK's largest sportswear retailer.

Acquisitions

Dunlop 

In February 2004, the company acquired Dunlop Slazenger for around £40 million, which included the Dunlop, Slazenger and Carlton brands. This was followed by the acquisitions of outdoor gear manufacturer Karrimor in March for a reported £5 million. In 2006 he acquired Kangol for an estimated £12 million. Most of these brands were bought from distressed sellers. After looking at a takeover, Sports Direct took a £9 million stake and signed a lucrative long-term deal in August 2005 with troubled brand Umbro, which was subsequently sold to Nike.

The brands themselves are an increasingly important part of the business, and Sports Direct made £10 million, from selling the intellectual-property rights to the Slazenger Golf brand to arch-rival JJB in 2005.

In 2016, Sumitomo Rubber Industries, a global tyre, sports goods, and industrial rubber products manufacturing company based in Kobe, Japan, filed for regulatory approval before the Philippine Competition Commission in connection with its planned acquisition of Dunlop-related wholesale, manufacturing, and licensing business from Sports Direct.

Sumitomo Rubber intended to acquire the entire issued share capital of Dunlop Brands Limited, Dunlop Slazenger 1902 Limited, and Dunlop Australia Limited, and the Dunlop-related business of Dunlop Sports Group Americas, Inc. which are subsidiaries of Sports Direct.

The Philippine Competition Commission approved the regulatory filing for the said acquisition. The acquisition allowed Sumitomo Rubber to consolidate the Dunlop brand across various products including sports goods worldwide.

Other acquisitions and closures 
On 10 August 2018, the House of Fraser entered administration. Later that day, Sports Direct agreed to buy all House of Fraser UK stores, the House of Fraser brand, and all of the stock in the business for £90 million in cash, converting all old House of Fraser stores into Sports Direct. Prior to the company entering administration, Sports Direct's Mike Ashley held an 11% stake in the company.

On 30 October 2018, Evans Cycles was purchased by Sports Direct in a pre-pack administration deal.

In February 2019 the group acquired Sofa.com for a nominal sum.

On 5 August 2019, Sports Direct purchased Jack Wills out of administration for £12.7 million after winning a competition against Edinburgh Woollen Mill.

On 24 August 2020, it was announced that Frasers Group would buy "certain" assets from DW Sports Fitness for £37m, but would not be using the firm's brand name.  Also in August 2020, during the COVID-19 pandemic, Ashley threatened landlords with House of Fraser store closures.

In December 2020, Debenhams announced it was going into liquidation, putting 12,000 jobs in 124 UK stores at risk unless the administrators could find buyers for all or parts of the business. Frasers Group was reported to be in talks to acquire Debenhams, though it was later reported that Ashley was mainly interested in using empty Debenhams stores to expand his other chains, including House of Fraser, Sports Direct and Flannels; taking 'vacant possession' would avoid redundancy costs for existing staff.

In January 2021, it was announced that the Jenners House of Fraser store in Edinburgh was closing for good and 200 jobs would be lost.

In April 2021 the group announced it had doubled the hit it expects to take from the coronavirus pandemic to £200 million.

In February 2022, the group announced it had purchased some of the assets of the Studio Retail Group from administration.

On 1 June 2022, it was revealed that the group had bought the intellectual property of Missguided and its sister brand Mennace for about £20 million, after they went into administration the previous day.

In November 2022, it was announced Frasers Group had acquired one of London's oldest bespoke tailors, Gieves & Hawkes.

Brands

Retail outlet 

 Firetrap
 Flannels 
 French Connection 
 Game 
 House of Fraser (Current flagship)
 Sneakerboy Australia
 Sofa.com
 Jack Wills

Sells Sport/Exercise Products
 EAG 
 Eastern Mountain Sports
 Evans Cycles
 Field & Trek
 Gelert
 Heatons 
 Sportland International Group 
 Sports Direct (former flagship) 
 Sweatshop
 Tri UK 
 USC

Online Exclusive brands
 Ace
 ASOS 
 Missguided
 Mennace
 Studio

Clothing and equipment 

 Agent Provocateur 
 British Knights
 Carlton
 Donnay
 Everlast
 Firetrap
 Gelert
 GoldDigga
 Grumpytoly Apparel
 Gul
 Hot Tuna
 Kangol
 Karrimor
 LA Gear
 Lillywhites
 Lonsdale
 Lovell Rugby
 Lovell Rackets
 Miso
 Miss Fiori
 Muddyfox
 Mulberry 
 Nevica
 No Fear
 Slazenger
 Sondico
 SoulCal
 USA Pro
 Voodoo Dolls

Former brands 

 Bike Clearance
 Dunlop 
 Original Shoe Company 
 Umbro

Defunct and Inactive 

 Dixon Sports Ltd 
 Gamestation 
 Gilesports 
 Hargreaves Sports 
 JJB Sports 
 MegaValue.com 
 PWP Sport 
 Republic 
 SheRunsHeRuns 
 Sports Soccer 
 Sports World 
 Streetwise Sports

Notes

References

External links

 

Companies based in Derbyshire
Shirebrook
Retail companies established in 1982
Sporting goods retailers of the United Kingdom
Companies listed on the London Stock Exchange
1982 establishments in England
English brands
Sports Direct
2007 initial public offerings